Magdalena van de Passe (1600–1638) was a Dutch engraver and member of the Van de Passe family of artists from Cologne who were active in the Northern Netherlands.  She specialized in landscapes and portraits, and trained the polymath Anna Maria van Schurman in engraving, one of the few known early examples of the training of one woman artist by another.

Biography
Magdalena was born in Cologne, Germany.  She was the daughter of the engraver Crispijn van de Passe, and the sister of Simon, Crispijn II, Willem, and Martha. She  signed her first works at the age of 14, two years younger than her brothers. When she was 33 or 34, she married the artist Frederick van Bevervoordt , but he died two years later. After his death she returned to live with her father. It is unknown whether she continued to work as an engraver after this point.  She taught Anna Maria van Schurman engraving.

Like her siblings, she assisted her father with his engraving projects. She is known for landscapes and portraits, but also collaborated with her brother Willem on 65 engravings for Henry Holland's Heroologia Anglica, published in 1620. She helped her father with an illustration to Karel van Mander's translation of Ovid's Metamorphoses, but this major project was never completed.

She was friends with the painter Adriaen van de Venne, who wrote a poem dedicated to her, as did the family friend Arnold Buchelius. She was granted a patent from the States General for the manufacture of sleeping caps printed with engravings of popular figures. Though these seem to have been quite popular, none survive today.  She died in Utrecht.

References

External links

Magdalena van de Passe on Artnet
Digitized Copy of Heroologia Anglica: https://archive.org/details/gri_33125009486511 

1600 births
1638 deaths
German engravers
Artists from Cologne
Dutch women artists
Glass engravers
Women engravers
17th-century women artists
17th-century engravers
Dutch glass artists
German glass artists